Baglioni Hotel London is a 5-star luxury hotel in London, England. It is located at Hyde Park Gate in the Kensington area of London in a Georgian-era building overlooking Hyde Park. It is owned by Baglioni Hotels, an Italian firm that also has hotels in Venice, Milan and several other places.

Interior
The hotel contains Italian furnishings and has a fountain, stone floors and large gold vases. The hotel has 67 rooms, with 53 suites, including three executive suites and two presidential suites.

The hotel is served by the Ristorante Brunello which specialises in Mediterranean food, particularly Italian cuisine, and uses fresh ingredients imported from Italy for authenticity. It has over 500 wines on offer, including a collection of Sassicaia wines. The restaurant is located on the ground floor, facing Kensington Gardens. Furnishings include comfortable grey and gold velvet armchairs, Murano glass candelabras and a large fireplace.

The hotel also offers a VIP Maserati courtesy car service.

Reception
Baglioni Hotel London is recognized as one of The Leading Small Hotels of the World. In 2007, it was 
voted by the Conde Nast Traveller, Reader's Travel Awards as the "15th Best UK Business Hotel". The Ristorante Brunello has been awarded with a Michelin star.

References

External links
Official website
Photos of Hotel Baglioni on Twenga.co.uk

Hotels in London
Buildings and structures in the Royal Borough of Kensington and Chelsea
Hotels established in 2004
2004 establishments in England